Hautmont is a commune in the Nord department in northern France.

On August 3, 2008, a narrow but strong F4 tornado swept through the town, as well as Maubeuge, Neuf-Mesnil and Boussières-sur-Sambre damaging hundreds of buildings, forty of which collapsed. The tornado killed three people and injured seventeen others. The tornado was part of an outbreak that produced nine other tornadoes.

Population

Heraldry

International relations
Hautmont is twinned with Kalisz in Poland (since 1958).

See also
Communes of the Nord department

References

Communes of Nord (French department)